1978–79 Hong Kong FA Cup was the fifth staging of the Hong Kong FA Cup.

Teams 
 Blake Garden 
 Bulova (From a lower division league)
 Caroline Hill
 Eastern
 Happy Valley
 HKFC (From a lower division league)
 Kowloon Fruit (From a lower division league)
 Kui Tan 
 Po Chai Pills (From a lower division league)
 Police
 Sea Bee
 Seiko
 South China
 Tung Sing
 Urban Services
 Yuen Long

Fixtures and results

Bracket

Final

Trivia
 Yuen Long, by winning the FA Cup, prevented Seiko from capturing all the 6 major trophies (First Division, Senior Shield, Viceroy Cup, Chairman's Cup, Wooden Shield and FA Cup) in the season. 
 Despite losing the cup, Seiko kept the record of losing no matches in the 90-minute time among all local competitions in the season.

References

Hong Kong FA Cup
Hong Kong
Cup